Elections to the sixth Odisha Legislative Assembly were held 1974.

Constituencies

The elections were held for 147 seats. A total of 722 candidates contested for these 147 seats.

Political Parties

Three national parties, Communist Party of India, Indian National Congress and Swatantra Party along with the state party Utkal Congress took part in the assembly election. Congress party emerged again as the winner by winning 50% of the seats with a vote share of 37.44%. Nandini Satpathy again become the Chief Minister of the state.

Results

List of winning candidate

See also
 1974 elections in India
 1971 Odisha Legislative Assembly election
 1977 Odisha Legislative Assembly election

References

State Assembly elections in Odisha
Odisha
1970s in Orissa